Bouffier is a surname. Notable people with the surname include:

 Bryan Bouffier (born 1978), French rally driver
 François Bouffier (1844–1881),  French non-commissioned officer
 Gabriel Bouffier, French racing cyclist
 Volker Bouffier (born 1951), German politician of the Christian Democratic Union